Bumpus is both a surname and a given name. Notable people with the name include:

Cornelius Bumpus (1945–2004), American musician
Earl Bumpus (1914–1985), American baseball player
Hermon Carey Bumpus (1862–1943), American college administrator
Judith Bumpus (1939–2010), British radio producer
Michael Bumpus (born 1985), American football player
Bumpus Jones (1870–1938), American baseball player

Fictional characters
The Bumpuses, unseen family in the book A Christmas Story

See also
Bumpass (disambiguation)
Bumpus Cove, Tennessee
Bumpus Mills, Tennessee
Bumpus Quarry, Maine